2015 in men's road cycling is about the 2015 men's bicycle races governed by the UCI.

World Championships

The World Road Championships is set to be held in Richmond, Virginia, United States, from 19 to 27 September 2015.

Grand Tours

UCI World Tour

2.HC Category Races

1.HC Category Races

UCI tours

Championships

National Championships

Games

Island Games 

 Cycling at the 2015 European Games
 Cycling at the 2015 Pan American Games
 Cycling at the 2015 Southeast Asian Games
 Cycling at the 2015 Military World Games

UCI Teams

UCI WorldTeams

UCI Professional Continental and Continental teams

References

 

Men's road cycling by year